Alton Jay Rubin (February 10, 1932 – August 26, 1993), who performed as Rockin' Dopsie (sometimes Rockin' Dupsee), was an American zydeco singer and accordion player who enjoyed popular success first in Europe and later in the United States.

Biography
He was born in Carencro, Louisiana, the son of Walter Rubin, who played accordion at local dances.  Alton Rubin's first language was Louisiana Creole French.  He was given his first accordion at the age of 14, and, being left-handed, learned to play it upside down.  He began performing at local parties, and soon outstripped his father's abilities.  He moved with his parents to Lafayette, Louisiana at the age of 19, and began playing in clubs in the mid-1950s with his cousin Chester Zeno on washboard.  He took his stage name from a visiting dancer called Doopsie (and pronouncing his own name the same way).   At the same time, he continued with his day job, eventually becoming an electrical contractor.

Dopsie played music for dancing, assimilating R&B influences into zydeco and sometimes covering R&B hits in a zydeco style.  He performed around Louisiana, and recorded occasionally for small independent labels in the 1950s and 1960s.  In 1976 he appeared at the New Orleans Jazz and Heritage Festival, and was signed by the Swedish record label Sonet, who issued his first album, Doin' The Zydeco, in 1976.  Starting in 1979, he toured Europe regularly with his group, the Twisters, and his popularity there led to him recording a string of albums for Sonet in the late 1970s and early 1980s.

In the 1980s, he started to gain attention in the US.  He played accordion on the zydeco-influenced song "That Was Your Mother" on Paul Simon's Graceland album in 1986.  He recorded the album Crowned Prince Of Zydeco in 1987.  His final album in 1991, Louisiana Music, received a Grammy Award nomination.   Dopsie also recorded with Bob Dylan and Cyndi Lauper, and in 1992 appeared in the film Delta Heat.

He died from a heart attack in 1993, aged 61, and was buried at Calvary Cemetery in Lafayette.

Legacy
Since his death, his band, The Twisters, has continued to perform. Now led by his son Dopsie Jr. (accordionist, vocalist and washboard player), with sons Alton Jr. ("Tiger") on drums, and Anthony Rubin on accordion, the band is called Rockin' Dopsie, Jr. & The Zydeco Twisters. Dopsie's younger son Dwayne also plays accordion and leads his own band, Dwayne Dopsie & the Zydeco Hellraisers.

Dopsie was related to professional tennis championship player Chanda Rubin.

Quotation

"I'm the only man in the world that plays the accordion upside-down," Rockin' Dopsie said. "It's all because daddy didn't taught me how to play. I just picked it up."

Discography

Studio and live albums

Singles and EPs

Various artist compilation albums

Guest appearance credits

See also
List of folk musicians
Long Beach Blues Festival
San Francisco Blues Festival

References

External links
 
 

1932 births
1993 deaths
People from Carencro, Louisiana
Zydeco accordionists
American accordionists
Musicians from Louisiana
20th-century American musicians
Rounder Records artists
Atlantic Records artists
GNP Records artists
20th-century accordionists
Sonet Records artists
Maison de Soul Records artists
African-American Catholics